Kisozi is a settlement in the Gomba District in the Central Region of Uganda.

Location
The coordinates of the town are 0°04'16.0"N,  31°35'58.0"E (Latitude:0.071119; Longitude:31.599439).

Points of interest
These points of interest lie within the town limits or near the edges of town:

 offices of Kisozi Town Council
 NEC Farm Katonga - A  cattle ranch, a subsidiary of National Enterprise Corporation, the business arm of the Uganda People's Defence Force.
 Kizozi Ranch - A   cattle ranch belonging to Yoweri Museveni, the president of Uganda (since 1986).
 Kisozi central market
 Katonga River - The town sits on the northern banks of the river.

See also
 List of cities and towns in Uganda
 National Enterprise Corporation

References

External links

Populated places in Central Region, Uganda
Gomba District